Yeavering Bell is a twin-peaked hill near the River Glen in north Northumberland, England, to the west of Wooler, and forming part of the Cheviot Hills. The summit, 1158 feet (361 metres) above sea level, is encircled by the wall of a late-prehistoric hillfort, a tribal centre of the Votadini called in Brythonic and Old Welsh Din Gefron, from which the name stems (Old English *geafringa-).

On the sides of the hill, and in a high valley between the Bell and the next hill, called Whitelaw, there are many remains of stone huts rudely flagged, some in groups surrounded by rampiers (ramparts), and others isolated. Barrows, too, are numerous here.

The hillfort enclosure was constructed in two phases, according to a survey by English Heritage. The 'roundhouses' within the fort suggests communal living but these need not all have been dwellings. The differing size of these buildings may have indicated the status of their original occupants.

The buildings of the hillfort would have been bright pink when first constructed, being made from local andesite. This stone is pink when quarried and turns, after a few years’ exposure to the elements, to a dull grey.

Yeavering Bell overlooks the important Angle site of Yeavering in the valley just to the north, which was mentioned by Bede in his Ecclesiastical History of the English People. The outlines of the wooden royal hall and assembly building have been marked out in the grass at Yeavering, and can be picked out from the slopes of Yeavering Bell.

References

Bibliography
 Oswald A and Pearson S (2005) Yeavering Bell Hillfort. 98-126 in Frodsham and O’Brien.
 Pearson S (1998) Yeavering Bell Hillfort, Northumberland. English Heritage: Archaeological Investigation Report Series AI/3/2001.
 W & R Chambers (1869), the Book of Days, December 17

External links

 Gefrin.com... Information, maps, diagrams, access routes and more about Yeavering, Gefrin and the hillforts in the north Cheviot hills

Hill forts in Northumberland
Hills of Northumberland
Former populated places in Northumberland
Kirknewton, Northumberland